Edith Dircksey Brown Cowan (1861–1932) was an Australian social reformer. 

Edith Cowan may also refer to:

 Edith Cowan University, Perth, Western Australia, Australia
 Edith Cowan College, Perth, Western Australia, Australia; formerly Perth Institute of Business and Technology
 Edith Dircksey Cowan Memorial, Kings Park, Perth, Western Australia, Australia

See also

 
 Cowan (disambiguation)
 Edith